Pyrgolidium internodula is a species of sea snail, a marine gastropod mollusk in the family Pyramidellidae, the pyrams and their allies.

Description
The shell has a rosy color. The length of the shell varies between 3 mm and 7 mm. The whorls of the teleoconch are flattened with straight narrow ribs, becoming evanescent at the periphery of the body whorl. The interspaces are much wider, with two spiral series of nodules.

Distribution
This species occurs in the following locations:
 Angola
 Cape Verde
 European waters (ERMS scope)
 Mediterranean Sea
 Morocco
 Portuguese Exclusive Economic Zone
 Senegal
 Spanish Exclusive Economic Zone

References

Further reading
 Gofas, S.; Le Renard, J.; Bouchet, P. (2001). Mollusca, in: Costello, M.J. et al. (Ed.) (2001). European register of marine species: a check-list of the marine species in Europe and a bibliography of guides to their identification. Collection Patrimoines Naturels, 50: pp. 180–213
 Giannuzzi-Savelli R., Pusateri F., Micali, P., Nofroni, I., Bartolini S. (2014). Atlante delle conchiglie marine del Mediterraneo, vol. 5 (Heterobranchia). Edizioni Danaus, Palermo, pp. 1– 111 with 41 unnumbered plates (figs. 1-363), appendix pp. 1–91 page(s): 86, appendix p. 33-34, 81

External links
 To Biodiversity Heritage Library (4 publications)
 To CLEMAM
 To Encyclopedia of Life
 

Pyramidellidae
Gastropods described in 1848
Molluscs of the Atlantic Ocean
Molluscs of the Mediterranean Sea
Molluscs of Angola
Gastropods of Africa
Gastropods of Cape Verde
Invertebrates of North Africa
Invertebrates of West Africa